Lac Flammarion is a volcanic crater lake in Guadeloupe, which straddles the communes of Gourbeyre and Capesterre.

The water is acidic with a pH ranging between 4.5 and 5. Its temperature ranges between 18 and 19 °C.

The crater was named by the famous alpinist Mr. Camille Thionville, chef du service de l'Enregistrement et des Domaines.

References

Bodies of water of Guadeloupe
Flammarion